Geoff Lomax (born 6 July 1964) is a former English  footballer who played as a defender.

References

1964 births
Living people
English footballers
Association football defenders
Rochdale A.F.C. players
Manchester City F.C. players
Carlisle United F.C. players
English Football League players